The Journal of Chiropractic Education is a medical journal and the official journal of the Association of Chiropractic Colleges. It publishes articles related to "educational theory, methods, and content relevant to the practice of chiropractic". The journal is indexed in PubMed (but not MEDLINE) and CINAHL.

External links 
 Official site
 Archives on PubMed Central

Publications established in 1987
Education journals
Biannual journals
English-language journals
Chiropractic journals